Inside NBS is a spin-off to NASCAR Inside Nextel Cup, and aired on Speed Channel. Like its Inside Cup counterpart, which focused on the NASCAR Cup Series, the show focused primarily the NASCAR Busch Series, and, like Inside Cup, was hosted by Allen Bestwick, and used a 3-driver expert panel to analyze news and recent Busch Series action. It lasted only one season, that being 2003.

American sports television series
Speed (TV network) original programming
NASCAR on television
2003 American television series debuts
2003 American television series endings
NASCAR Xfinity Series